The Mosara Garden or el-Mosara was a vast royal garden to the north of Fes el-Jdid, the historic citadel and palace-city of the Marinid dynasty in Fes, Morocco. The gardens were created by the Marinid sultan Abu Ya'qub Yusuf in 1286 and became famous in part because of a huge noria (waterwheel) that was created to provide it with water. The gardens were abandoned and progressively ruined during the Saadian period (16th-17th centuries) and have since disappeared, leaving only traces in a few structures such as Bab Segma.

History 

Abu Yusuf Ya'qub, who founded Fes el-Jdid as a new Marinid royal city in 1276, had also wished to create a vast royal pleasure garden, perhaps in emulation of those he might have admired in Granada (such as the Generalife); however, he died in 1286 before this could be accomplished. His son and successor, Abu Ya'qub Yusuf, carried out the work instead in 1287. He enlisted an Andalusian engineer, Ibn al-Hajj from Seville, to help create a vast garden to the north of Fes el-Jdid, along with the water distribution infrastructure required to maintain it. Among these works was a famous and enormous noria which raised water from the Oued Fes (Fes River) up to an aqueduct that then ran north from Bab Dekkakin to Bab Segma. The garden and its structures came to be popularly called el-Mosara, meaning "the marvel", due to the strong impression they made on visitors. The huge noria was frequently the subject of commentary by chroniclers and travelers in subsequent centuries.

The gardens fell into ruin and eventually disappeared in subsequent centuries, most likely during the neglect of Fes throughout the Saadian period (16th-17th centuries), but traces of its structures have survived to modern times. The most prominent remains are the octagonal towers of Bab Segma, once the entrance gate to the gardens, but some faint remains of the water basins are also documented. The site of the garden is now mostly occupied by the large Bab Segma Cemetery (probably dating from the time of Moulay Rashid), inside of which the outline of some of the original basins can still be discerned. The noria reportedly disappeared in 1888, leaving only remains of its stone base. Some modern authors sometimes identify the waterwheel on the western edge of the Jnan Sbil Gardens with the remains of the great Marinid noria, but other authors have rebuked this by observing that the Grand Noria would have been far larger and would have been located where the Dar al-Makina currently stands.

Description 
The gardens covered 67 hectares to the north of Fes el-Jdid and the Royal Palace; an area comparable in size to the city itself. They were surrounded by their own walls which seem to have been simply a continuation of the outer wall of Fes el-Jdid (which was protected by double walls along most of its perimeter, though the outer wall was generally smaller and less heavily fortified than the inner wall). A gate known as Bab Segma, with two massive octagonal towers, acted as an entrance to the gardens on their eastern side, not far from Bab Dekkakin and the northern entrance of the city.

The creation and maintenance of the gardens required the diversion of water from the Oued Fes river which flowed along the north edge of Fes el-Jdid. The water was raised into an aqueduct via a huge noria (waterwheel) measuring 26 metres in diameter and 2 metres wide. The noria, sometimes referred to as the "Grand Noria", was located next to Bab Dekkakin. Its enormous wheel was made of wood, reportedly covered in copper, and held up on a stone base. From Bab Dekkakin, the aqueduct then carried the water to Bab Segma further north, and from there it was carried further into three large square basins spread across the gardens. According to one historical source, at least three other norias operated inside the gardens and were crucial to their existence. Also located inside the gardens was a msalla, an open-air prayer area, known as the Msalla of the Sultan or the Msalla of Bab Segma.

See also 

 Fortifications of Fez
 Jnan Sbil Gardens

References 

Fez, Morocco
Gardens in Morocco